The 1926 Stanford football team was an American football team that represented Stanford University in the Pacific Coast Conference (PCC) during the 1926 college football season. In head coach Pop Warner's third season at Stanford, the team compiled a 10–0 record during the regular season, outscored opponents by a total of 261 to 66, and won the PCC championship. Stanford then faced undefeated Alabama in the 1927 Rose Bowl, which ended in a 7–7 tie. 

In December 1926, prior to the Rose Bowl, Stanford was selected as the national champion under the Dickinson System. Stanford garnered 22.5 points from Dickinson. Navy ranked second with 21.88 points, and Alabama was ranked No. 10 with 16.67 points, due to weak schedule strength.

In later retroactive ratings, Stanford was chosen as a co-national champion with Alabama by the Helms Athletic Foundation, National Championship Foundation, and Jeff Sagarin (using the ELO-Chess methodology).

The team played its home games at Stanford Stadium in Stanford, California.

Schedule

Game summaries

Rose Bowl

The 1927 Rose Bowl was held on January 1, 1927, in Pasadena, California. Stanford (10-0, 4-0 PCC) faced off against the Southern Conference Champions, the Alabama Crimson Tide (9-0, 8-0 SoCon). The game would end in a 7–7, and was the last Rose Bowl game to end in a tie.

United Press called the 1927 Rose Bowl "the football championship of America", and the game was considered the most exciting in the series up to that time.  The crowd of 68,000 set an attendance record.  Stanford's George Bogue missed an 18-yard field goal attempt in the first quarter, then threw a touchdown pass to Ed Walker and kicked the point after to put Stanford up, 7-0.  Stanford held that lead through most of the rest of the game, but in the final minutes, they were forced to punt on fourth down.  Frankie Wilton's kick was blocked, and Alabama took over 14 yards from goal.  Four plays later, and with a minute left, Jimmy Johnson carried the ball for a touchdown, making it 7-6.  The two-point conversion, and overtime, were decades in the future.  Stanford's only hope was to block the point after, but Alabama ran the play quickly and Herschel Caldwell's kick tied Stanford, and took away a Stanford victory in the final minute.

Awards
Six Stanford players received mention on the 1926 All-America college football team and/or the 1926 All-Pacific Coast football team:
 End Ted Shipkey 
 First-team All-America honors from the All-America Board and Red Grange.
 First-team All-Pacific Coast honors from the Associated Press (AP) and United Press (UP)
 Halfback Dick Hyland 
 First-team All-America honors from Lawrence Perry.
 First-team All-Pacific Coast honors from the UP and second-team honors from the AP.
 Guard Fred H. Swan
 First-team All-America honors from Charles E. Parker for the New York World News Service
 First-team All-Pacific Coast honors from the AP and UP
 Halfback/fullback George Bogue 
 Third-team All-America honors from Billy Evans and Walter Eckersall.
 First-team All-Pacific Coast honors from the AP and UP
 End Edgar Walker
 First-team All-Pacific Coast honors from the AP and UP
 Tackle Sellman
 First-team All-Pacific Coast honors from the UP

References

Stanford
Stanford Cardinal football seasons
College football national champions
Pac-12 Conference football champion seasons
College football undefeated seasons
Stanford football